Stomphastis rorkei is a moth of the family Gracillariidae. It is known to live in South Africa, Namibia and Zimbabwe.

The larvae feed on Croton gratissimus. They mine the leaves of their host plant. The mine has the form of a moderate, irregular, oblong, semi-transparent blotch mine which starts as a narrow, rather indistinct gallery.

References

Stomphastis
Moths of Sub-Saharan Africa
Lepidoptera of Namibia
Lepidoptera of Zimbabwe
Lepidoptera of South Africa